A list of the windmills in France. Mills standing are in bold, remains are in italics.

Aisne

Alpes-de-Haute-Provence

Ardèche

Ardennes

Ariège

Aube

Aude
See List of windmills in Aude

Aveyron

Bas-Rhin

Bouches-du-Rhône
See List of windmills in Bouches-du-Rhône

Calvados

Cantal

Charente

Charente-Maritime
See List of windmills in Charente-Maritime

Cher
See List of windmills in Cher

Corrèze

Corse-du-Sud

Côte d'Or

Côtes d'Armor
See List of windmills in Côtes-d'Armor

Deux-Sèvres
See List of windmills in Deux-Sèvres

Dordogne

Doubs

Drôme

Essonne

Eure

Eure-et-Loir

Finistère
See List of windmills in Finistère

Gard

Gers

Gironde
See List of windmills in Gironde

Hauts-de-Seine

Haute-Corse

Haute-Garonne
See List of windmills in Haute-Garonne

Haute-Loire

Hérault

Ille-et-Vilaine
See List of windmills in Ille-et-Vilaine

Indre

Indre-et-Loire

Landes

Loire-Atlantique
See List of windmills in Loire-Atlantique.

Loiret

Loir-et-Cher

Lot

Lot-et-Garonne
See List of windmills in Lot-et-Garonne

Maine-et-Loire
See List of windmills in Maine-et-Loire.

Manche
See List of Windmills in Manche.

Marne

Mayenne

Meuse

Morbihan
See List of windmills in Morbihan.

Nièvre

Nord
See List of windmills in Nord.

Oise

Pas-de-Calais
See List of windmills in Pas-de-Calais.

Pyrénées-Orientales

Rhône

Saône-et-Loire

Sarthe

Savoie

Seine

Seine et Marne

Seine-Maritime

Seine-Saint-Denis

Somme
See List of windmills in Somme.

Tarn

Tarn-et-Garonne

Val-de-Marne

Val-d'Oise

Var

Vaucluse

Vendée
See List of windmills in Vendée

Vienne

Yonne

Yvelines

Sources
 
Moulins-a-Vent

Notes

 
France